Germacrene A alcohol dehydrogenase is an enzyme with systematic name germacra-1(10),4,11(13)-trien-12-ol:NADP+ oxidoreductase. This enzyme catalyses the following chemical reaction

 germacra-1(10),4,11(13)-trien-12-ol + 2 NADP+ + H2O  germacra-1(10),4,11(13)-trien-12-oate + 2 NADPH + 3 H+ (overall reaction)
 (1a) germacra-1(10),4,11(13)-trien-12-ol + NADP+  germacra-1(10),4,11(13)-trien-12-al + NADPH + H+
 (1b) germacra-1(10),4,11(13)-trien-12-al + NADP+ + H2O  germacra-1(10),4,11(13)-trien-12-oate + NADPH + 2 H+

In Lactuca sativa this enzyme is a multifunctional enzyme with EC 1.14.13.123.

References

External links 
 

EC 1.1.1